The 1904 Canadian federal election was held on November 3, 1904 to elect members  of the House of Commons of Canada of the 10th Parliament of Canada.  Prime Minister Sir Wilfrid Laurier led the Liberal Party of Canada to a third term in government, with an increased majority, and over half of the popular vote.

Sir Robert Borden's Conservatives and Liberal-Conservatives were unable to challenge the Liberals effectively, and lost a small portion of their popular vote, along with four seats, including his own. Borden re-entered parliament the next year in a by-election.

This was the last election until 1949 in which parts of the Northwest Territories were granted representation. Most of the settled regions of the NWT entered Confederation as the provinces of Alberta and Saskatchewan on 1 September 1905, although its MP's continued to sit as representatives of the old ridings until the 10th Parliament's dissolution.

One of the key issues in the election was Imperial Preference.

National results 

Note:

* Party did not nominate candidates in the previous election.

Results by province

xx - indicates less than 0.05% of the popular vote.

See also
 
List of Canadian federal general elections
List of political parties in Canada
10th Canadian Parliament

Notes

References

Further reading
 

 
 Federal
1904
November 1904 events